Josip Mikulić (born 12 April 1986 in Ljubuški) is a Bosnian-Herzegovinian born Croatian footballer, most recently playing for HNK Gorica in the Croatian Second division.

Career

Croatia
Mikulić began his career in the youth ranks of top Croatian side Dinamo Zagreb before going on loan to Croatia Sesvete during the 2004 season. After one season with Sesvete he moved to Croatian top flight side NK Zagreb and remained there for five seasons, playing 49 league games for the team in total.

United States
Mikulić officially signed with the Chicago Fire on January 6, 2011 as a free agent. He made his debut for his new club on March 19, 2011, in Chicago's 1-1 tie with FC Dallas on the opening day of the 2011 MLS season. At the end of the 2011 season, Mikulić left Chicago to return to Croatia due to family reasons.

Back to Croatia
After returning home from the USA, Mikulić was a free agent for seven months. After failing to find a club in such a long period, Mikulić agreed to sign for second division club HNK Gorica.

References

External links
 
Profile from Chicago Fire
Profile at hnl-statistika.com

1986 births
Living people
People from Ljubuški
Association football central defenders
Croatian footballers
Croatia youth international footballers
GNK Dinamo Zagreb players
NK Croatia Sesvete players
NK Zagreb players
Chicago Fire FC players
HNK Gorica players
Croatian Football League players
Major League Soccer players
First Football League (Croatia) players
Croatian expatriate footballers
Expatriate soccer players in the United States
Croatian expatriate sportspeople in the United States